The HTC Ruby (known as the HTC Amaze 4G in the United States and Canada) is a smartphone developed by the HTC Corporation. It was released by T-Mobile in the United States on 10 October 2011. It was first released in Canada by Telus on 4 November 2011. Subsequently, other Canadian carriers such as Mobilicity and Wind Mobile have released this phone on 1 December 2011 and 2 December 2011, respectively. Marketed at the time as being equipped “with the most advanced camera of any smartphone”, the device is armed with an 8-megapixel camera, a 1080p HD video recorder, a backside illuminated sensor for improved low light performance, and a dual LED flash. In addition to having a great camera, the Amaze 4G features a Qualcomm Snapdragon S3 1.5 Gdual-corporate processor, a 4.3-inch QHD super LCD multi-touch display, and 1 GB of RAM. It was released with version 2.3.4 of the Android operating system. Starting from May 21, 2012, some HTC Amaze devices were upgradeable to Android 4.0.3 Ice Cream Sandwich. The HTC Amaze 4G also features a huge resource of aftermarket ROM's.

See also
 List of Android devices
 List of HTC phones
 Comparison of smartphones
 Galaxy Nexus

References

Android (operating system) devices
Amaze 4G
Mobile phones introduced in 2011
Discontinued smartphones